Science Hill High School is a public high school in Johnson City, Tennessee, United States.

Campus
The Science Hill/ Liberty Bell/ Freedom Hall complex includes multiple athletic fields, large parking lots, and a 1-1/2-mile walking track that encircles the complex. 

https://en.wikipedia.org/wiki/Freedom_Hall_Civic_Center

https://en.wikipedia.org/wiki/Johnson_City,_Tennessee#Johnson_City_School_System

Music
Science Hill High School's marching band appeared in the 2009 Tournament of Roses Parade in Pasadena, California.
Participants in Bands of America.

Notable alumni 
 Lara Ballard (Attorney), Privacy and Intelligence Oversight Officer for U.S. Dept. of Homeland Security
Bill Bain, management consultant known for being a founder of management consultancy Bain & Company
 John Bowers, author
 Ernie Ferrell Bowman, Major League Baseball (MLB) infielder
 Larry Butler, Canadian Football League (CFL) player
 Jonny Campbell, professional soccer player
 Will Craig, MLB first baseman
 Matt Czuchry, actor
 Lindsay Ellis, film critic, author (Axiom's End)
 Aubrayo Franklin, National Football League (NFL) player
 Wyck Godfrey, film producer and executive
 Will Little, baseball umpire
 John Alan Maxwell, American artist and illustrator
 Joe McClain, MLB pitcher
 Daniel Norris, MLB pitcher
 Mo Sabri, recording artist
 Steve Spurrier, football coach, athlete, and Heisman Trophy winner
 Van Williams, NFL player

References

External links

Johnson City Schools website

Public high schools in Tennessee
Johnson City, Tennessee
Educational institutions established in 1867
International Baccalaureate schools in Tennessee
Schools in Washington County, Tennessee
1867 establishments in Tennessee